Dan Cristian Diaconescu (born December 9, 1967 in Caracal, Socialist Republic of Romania) is a Romanian journalist, politician, presenter, the founder and owner of the former DDTV and OTV television channels. He graduated from the Faculty of Mechanical Engineering, part of the Polytechnic Institute of Bucharest. In 2010, together with OTV show presenters, he formed the People's Party – Dan Diaconescu (PP-DD).

Biography
Diaconescu graduated the Faculty of Mechanical Engineering of the Polytechnic Institute of Bucharest, then became famous in part due to the TV show he hosted on his own TV channel, promptly referred to as Dan Diaconescu Direct (Dan Diaconescu Live). The show achieved its success peak during 2008–2009, when it regularly broadcast updates regarding the disappearance of Elodia Ghinescu, which he dubbed the "Elodia series".

Trial
On 22 June 2010, Diaconescu was arrested by the National Anti-corruption Agency (DNA) for extortion. Diaconescu was accused of having asked a mayor of a commune in Transylvania to take money in exchange for not publishing compromising data. A day later, he was arrested for 29 days, following the District 1 Court's decision. On 25 June, Diaconescu was released after Bucharest Court judges have upheld the decision of detention.

"I want to tell you that from this moment Dona, my daughter holds OTV and I announce my candidacy for the next presidential elections in 2014 or when are they" were the first words spoken by Dan Diaconescu, after he left the arrest.

Political activity
On 29 November 2010, Diaconescu founded the People's Party, the party idea based on a citizen residing in Cugir. He launched his candidacy for the presidential election in 2014.

At the legislative election of 2012, Diaconescu was nominated to run for a deputy term of Gorj in one electoral college against his challenger was then prime minister, Victor Ponta. He lost the election, and missed the entrance to the Parliament on redistribution. Therefore, he announced his retirement from politics.

Controversies
OTV was two times subject to license withdrawal by the Romanian Authority in Audiovisual CNA, first in 2002 for racism and antisemitic attitude, and second in January 2013 after OTV failed to prove payment of fines imposed by CNA for breaches of the Audiovisual Law during years 2009, 2010, 2011, and 2012.

Electoral history

Presidential elections

References

1967 births
Living people
People from Caracal, Romania
Romanian journalists
Romanian television presenters
Leaders of political parties in Romania
People's Party – Dan Diaconescu politicians
Candidates for President of Romania
Romanian white-collar criminals
Romanian politicians convicted of crimes
Romanian prisoners and detainees
Prisoners and detainees of Romania